Hungarian Army may refer to:

 The armies of the Kingdom of Hungary (1000–1526)
 Hungarians in Austrian service participating the Hungarian Revolution of 1848
 Royal Hungarian Honvéd (1867-1918)
 Royal Hungarian Army (1920-1945)
 Hungarian Ground Forces (1946-present)
 As a pars pro toto, the Hungarian Defence Force and its predecessors